The South Australian Broadband Research & Education Network (SABRENet) is a fibre-optic broadband network linking the major research and education sites in metropolitan Adelaide, South Australia. 

At over 110 km, SABRENet is the second-largest underground network in Adelaide after Telstra's.

Sites connected to SABRENet include
 All of Adelaide's university campuses
 Most teaching hospitals
 TAFE colleges
 Some public high schools
 Research precincts and science parks
 The Techport Australia maritime precinct
 Two AARNet POPs

SABRENet has been supported by the Australian Government under the Systemic Infrastructure Initiative, and forms part of the Australian Research and Education Network.

SABRENet Ltd is a non-profit public company formed by the SABRENet Members to build, own and operate SABRENet.
The SABRENet Ltd members are  Flinders University, the  South Australian Government, the
University of Adelaide, and the University of South Australia.

See also
 Systemic Infrastructure Initiative
 AARNet

External links 
 SABRENet web site
 'Grid Today' article - SABRENet Brings High-Speed to Southern Australia
 Media release - Premier of South Australia
 Media Release - University of Adelaide
 ABC TV - Behind the News

References 

Academic computer network organizations
Telecommunications in Australia
Scientific organisations based in Australia
Economy of Adelaide
Organizations established in 2007
Education in Adelaide